Omen (The Story Continues...) is the debut studio album by German Eurodance project Magic Affair. It was initially released on 16 May 1994 via Cologne Dance Label. The record also produced four singles, with the lead single "Omen III" becoming a big success in many European countries. The album continues the direction of the band's previous record Omen - The Story released in 1989 under name Mysterious Art; its first two singles were "Das Omen (Teil 1)" and "Carma (Omen 2)". Sales of the album exceeded 250,000 copies in 1995.

Track listing

Credits
Co-producer – Bernd Breiter, Bernd Waldstädt, Rainer Kempf
Mastering – Dave Bell
Producer – Mike Staab

Chart performance

References

External links
Lyrics for the album

1994 debut albums
Magic Affair albums